Timothy J. Grendell (born April 17, 1953) is a Republican politician who serves as judge on the Geauga County Court of Common Pleas.  He was a member of the Ohio Senate from 2005 to 2011, and of the Ohio House of Representatives from 2000 until 2004. Timothy Grendell was appointed to the Geauga County Court of Common Pleas as the Juvenile and Probate judge in 2011 by then Governor John Kasich after leaving Columbus, OH. After seeking election again, running  unopposed in 2020, he is currently Geauga Counties elected judge.

Education and career
Grendell received his JD from Case Western Reserve University School of Law and his LLM from the University of Virginia Law School.  He was awarded a Bachelor’s Degree in History from John Carroll University and graduated from St. Ignatius High School. Grendell served in the United States Army from 1978 to 1983, and was assigned to the Judge Advocate General (JAG) Office for the 2nd Armored Division at Fort Hood, Texas.

In private practice, Grendell took a case where he represented people opposed to a rezoning issue, the Ohio Supreme Court ruled against Grendell's clients and sharply criticized his reliance on "gamesmanship," "dilatory actions" and "unjustified delaying tactics". Months later, the court ordered Grendell to pay thousands of dollars in sanctions in a case where he tried to force the Ohio General Assembly to appropriate funds for an airport project he supported. The court said Grendell's lawsuit was "frivolous" and that "harassment is the only apparent rationale" for his accusations of criminal activity by one of the defendants.

Ohio state politics
With his wife, Diane Grendell, term limited from the House in 2000, he sought her position to replace her. He won a first term with 58.3% of the electorate. In 2002, Grendell won reelection with 69.7% of the vote against Democrat Meg Cacciacarro.

After serving two terms in the Ohio House of Representatives, Grendell ran for the Ohio Senate in 2004, and won with 59.6% of the vote over Democrat John Hawkins. He won reelection in 2008 unopposed. In the 128th General Assembly, Grendell was Chairman of the Ohio State Senate Judiciary and Criminal Justice Committee, Vice-Chairman of the State and Local Government and Veterans Affairs Committee, and a member of the Agriculture Committee, Environment and Natural Resources Committee, Correctional Institution Inspection Committee, and Joint Committee on Agency Rule Review.

During his time as state senator, Grendell worked to oppose the Great Lakes Compact, water conservation standards intended to ensure a level economic playing field for water use throughout the eight Great Lakes states. With support from Republican and Democratically led states, the Compact garnered support from business and environmental interests alike. Grendell made the argument that the Compact interfered with private property rights.

Grendell waived the two years left in his Senate term to run for his former House of Representatives seat in order to avoid term limits. On November 2, 2010, he won back his former House seat, the 98th district, decisively. With the Senate then having to appoint someone to the remainder of Grendell's unexpired Senate term, it was rumored that Grendell's wife, Diane Grendell, was a possibility for appointment. Upon learning that she would not be appointed, Grendell decided to remain in the Senate. Soon after, The Plain Dealer and other state newspapers began questioning Grendell's motives and true agenda as a state legislator.

In the 129th General Assembly, Grendell was a member of the committees on Agriculture, Environment and Natural Resources; Government Oversight and Reform (as vice chairman); Judiciary-Criminal Justice (as chairman); and State and Local Government and Veteran's Affairs. He served on the Ohio Attorney General's Human Trafficking Commission.

In September 2011, Grendell resigned after Gov. John Kasich appointed to serve as a judge on the Geauga County probate court. The chairwoman of the Geauga County Republican Party reported that Kasich appointed Grendell to the position "to get him out of Columbus," as the party considered him "a narcissist and mentally ill."

Judicial career
In September 2011 Grendell was appointed judge of the Geauga County Juvenile and Probate Court by the governor. He was elected again to the position in November 2014. In 2012 he presided over the hearing to bind over alleged Chardon school shooter T. J. Lane for trial in adult court per Ohio law. He is the co-creator of the Good Deeds Program with former Geauga County Recorder Sharon Gingerich, an effort to educate and assist Geauga County with probate planning for real estate and vehicles. He was named President of the Ohio Juvenile Judges in 2017 and elected to the National Committee of Probate Judges.

In January 2015, Grendell attempted to hold Geauga County Republican Party Chairwoman Nancy McArthur in contempt for expressing negative opinions about him, including calling him "a chameleon who takes revenge on people who disagree with him" in a juvenile court case before the judge, but the Appellate Court intervened to stop his contempt of court proceedings.

In December 2019, Grendell told election officials that he planned to retire before his term ended so that if re-elected, he could receive both a salary of over $150,000 and a pension, both funded by taxpayers. This practice is commonly known as “double dipping.”

During the COVID-19 pandemic in Ohio, Grendell has been publicly vocal about his belief that the pandemic is overblown. In May 2020, he attended a protest close to his courthouse and called public health restrictions unconstitutional. In June 2020, during his testimony to an Ohio Senate committee, he blamed health authorities and the media for inducing panic in the population over the virus. In court Grendell has referred to the pandemic as a "panic-demic" and claimed that at least 15 mothers were using it as an excuse to "mess with" fathers' parenting time in custody cases before him. In October 2020, Grendell made an order forbidding two parents from getting their child tested for COVID-19 without his permission. When a doctor ordered a test after the child in question developed severe breathing problems and was hospitalized, Grendell threatened to hold the mother in contempt of court. In December 2020, the Geauga Maple Leaf stated that multiple sources were reporting that Grendell and his wife had contracted COVID-19. There was a “shroud of secrecy” regarding his health and whereabouts but he had moved all appointments to be virtual.
On November 10, 2022 the Ohio Board of Professional Conduct submitted a certified grievance against the judge accusing him of misconduct on four separate counts, as first reported by the Geauga Maple Leaf. Among the accusations were jailing two minors for “unruly conduct” and “denying their mother”, the abuse of prestige of the office and for unethical behaviors. The Judge contends that he “did nothing wrong” during a November 11, 2022 interview with the Fox8 I-Team. The judge was quick to issue his own 82-page press release containing confidential juvenile court motions in an effort to clear his name. The progress of the case is ongoing and could take years. Further litigants are expected to grieve the Judge in the coming weeks. The case is still ongoing.

References

External links
Project Vote Smart - Senator Timothy J. Grendell (OH) profile
Follow the Money - Tim Grendell
2006 2004 2002 HD-98 2002 HD-682000 Senate campaign contributions
2006 attorney general campaign contributions
Tim Grendell for State Representative official campaign website
"The Family Court Judge Who Threatened a Mother With Contempt of Court for Getting Her Child a COVID-19 Test" - article at Pro Publica

Republican Party Ohio state senators
Republican Party members of the Ohio House of Representatives
Politicians from Cleveland
1953 births
Living people
Case Western Reserve University School of Law alumni
University of Virginia School of Law alumni
John Carroll University alumni
21st-century American politicians
People from Geauga County, Ohio